Ligota-Ligocka Kuźnia is a district of Rybnik, Silesian Voivodeship, southern Poland. On December 31, 2013 it had 3,900 inhabitants.

The district encompasses three historical settlements:
 Ligota,
 Ligocka Kuźnia,
 Raszowiec;

Ligota is a common name for villages in Western Poland. The word refers to the medieval custom of village founders being exempt from paying duties to their lords for a period of 5-8 years. In 1740 a small steel mill, called kuźnia (a smithy), was established here. Around it evolved Ligocka Kuźnia. It was modernised in years 1821–1822, but ceased to function in the late 19th century. Raszowiec was first mentioned in 1788. It had, however, always constituted an administrative part of Ligota, even though it belonged to the parish in Boguszowice.

After World War I in the Upper Silesia plebiscite 1406 out of 2,195 voters in Ligota voted in favour of joining Poland, against 784 opting for staying in Germany. In 1922 it became a part of Silesian Voivodeship, Second Polish Republic. Ligota (including Ligocka Kuźnia and Raszowiec) was absorbed by Rybnik in 1926.

References

Districts of Rybnik